Helge Andreas Løvland (11 May 1890, Froland – 26 April 1984, Oslo) was a Norwegian track and field athlete. He won the gold medal in the decathlon at the 1920 Olympics. Løvland was awarded the Egebergs Ærespris in 1919. Representing the club IF Ørnulf, he died in Oslo in 1984.

During the occupation of Norway by Nazi Germany he was arrested in August 1943 during the crackdown on military officers. He was imprisoned in Schildberg and Luckenwalde.

References

External links 
 
 
 

1890 births
1984 deaths
Norwegian pentathletes
Norwegian decathletes
Athletes (track and field) at the 1920 Summer Olympics
Olympic athletes of Norway
Olympic gold medalists for Norway
Nazi concentration camp survivors
Medalists at the 1920 Summer Olympics
Olympic gold medalists in athletics (track and field)
Olympic decathletes
People from Froland
Sportspeople from Agder